Bakula Bua ka Bhoot is a Hindi Comedy Drama started on June 24, 2017 on &TV. The show is about Bakula's family wanting Bakula To die because everyone in the house wants to do what they please. Mohit is the sensible one in the house and loves Bakula Bua the most and loves her more than his own mother. One day everyone prayed to god that Bakula died and it happened. But Bakula is now back on earth as a ghost and is going to get back at her family.

Cast

Main cast
 Sarita Joshi as Bakula Raja aka Bakula Bua- She is the matriarch of the Raja Family who has a bossy and dominating nature of which the whole family is tired but besides that she is fun-loving and also cares and loves her family a lot. She addresses Lord Krishna her husband and also and treats him too .
Vinay's sister, Rekha's sister-in-law, Shyam-Chandu-Mohit's aunt, Aditya-Megha-Munna-Malhar's Grandaunt, Rupal-Madhuri-Dhabbu aunt-in-law. (Protagonist)
 Apara Mehta as Rekha Vinay Raja- She always try to take the responsibilities of the house and family from Bakula. She is a silly and greedy woman who always goes to steal something or the other but gets caught. She is also adored and pampered by her husband a lot 
Vinay's Wife, Bakula's sister-in-law Mohit, Shyam, Chandu's mother, Rupal, Madhuri, Dabbu's Mother-in-law. Munna-Malhar-Megha-Aditya's Grandma.  
 Deepak Parekh - incorrect hyperlink as Vinay Raja, 
Rekha's Husband, Bakula's brother, Madhuri-Rupal-Dhabbu's father-in-law, Chandu-Shyam-Mohit's father, Malhar-Munna-Megha-Aditya's Grandpa. 
 Aryamann Seth as Mohit Vinay Raja, Vinay- Rekha's son, Chandu- Shyam Brother, Rupal-Madhuri's brother-in-law, Dhabbu's Husband. 
 Muskaan Bamne as Dhabbu Mohit Raja,
Mohits's wife, Vinay and Rekha's daughter-in-law, Rupal-Madhuri-Shyam-Chandu's sister-in-law. 
 Deeraj Kumar Rai as Chandu Vinay Raja, 
Madhuri's Husband, Megha-Malhar-Munna's Father, Vinay-Rekha's son, Mohit-Shyam's brother, Rupal-Dhabbu's Brother-in-law. 
 Ragini Rishi as Madhuri Chandu Raja, 
Chandu's wife, Malhar-Megha-Munna's mother, Vinay-Rekha's daughter-in-law, Mohit-Shyam-Rupal- Dhabbu's sister-in-law. 
  unknown as Malhar Chandu Raja,
Madhuri- Chandu's son, Megha-Munna's brother, Vinay-Rekha's grandson. 
unknown as Megha Chandu Raja, Madhuri- Chandu's daughter, Munna-Malhar's sister, Vinay-Rekha's grandson. 
 Mihir Arora as Munna Chandu Raja, Madhuri-Chandu's son, Megha-Malhar's brother, Vinay-Rekha's grandson.  
 Tulika Patel as Rupal Shyam Raja, Shyam's wife, Aditya's mother, Vinay-Rekha's Daughter-in-law.
Mohit-Dhabbu-Madhuri-Chandu's sister-in-law.  
 Amit Soni as Shyam Vinay Raja, Rupal's husband, Aditya's father, Vinay-Rekha's son, Madhuri-Dhabbu's brother-in-law, Chandu-Mohit's Brother. 
 Rahul Rawal as Aditya Shyam Raja,  Rupal-Shyam's son, Vinay-Rekha's Grandson. 
 Rahul Rudra Singh as Shankar Bhagwan of Swarglok
 Lucky Mehta as Niyati Devi
 Amardeep Garg as Brahmadev
 Sudha Chandran as Sanjana
 Abraam Pandey as Narada.
 Shraddha Dangar as ManiDadi
 Unknown as Chanchal

References

&TV original programming
2017 Indian television series debuts
2017 Indian television series endings
Hindi language television sitcoms
Ghosts in television
Hats Off Productions